The history of law enforcement in the United Kingdom charts the development of law enforcement in the United Kingdom and its predecessor states. It spans the period from the Middle Ages, through to the development of the first modern police force in the world in the nineteenth century, and the subsequent modernisation of policing in the twentieth and twenty-first centuries.

History

Middle Ages 
Early concepts of policing in Britain were based on the ancient laws which relied heavily on all subjects of the crown having a responsibility to assist in maintaining law and order. The posse comitatus originated in ninth century England along with the creation of the office of sheriff. Henry II of England made an Assize of Arms of 1181 which created an obligation on all freemen of England to possess and bear arms in the service of king and realm. The assize stipulated precisely the military equipment that each man should have according to his rank and wealth.

The Ordinance of 1233 required the appointment of watchmen. The Ordinance of 1252 provided for the enforcement of the Assize of Arms of 1181 and the appointment of constables to summon men to arms, quell breaches of the peace, and to deliver offenders to the sheriff. It expanded the 1181 Assize of Arms by adding the system of watch and ward, and pointing the way forward to subsequent legislation along similar lines by Edward I and Henry IV.

The Statute of Winchester 1285 was the primary piece of legislation that regulated the policing in the period after the Norman Conquest until the nineteenth century. Of particular note was the requirement to raise hue and cry, and that "the whole hundred ... shall be answerable" for any theft or robbery, in effect a form of collective responsibility.

Watchmen and constables
During this period, law enforcement and policing were organised by local communities such as town authorities. In Scotland, the first statutory police force is believed to be the High Constables of Edinburgh, who were created by the Scottish parliament in 1611 to "guard their streets and to commit to ward all person found on the streets after the said hour". Within local areas in England, a  constable could be attested by two or more Justices of the Peace, following a procedure that some sources say had its roots in an Act of the Parliament of England of 1673. 

From the 1730s, local improvement Acts made by town authorities often included provision for paid watchmen or constables to patrol towns at night, while rural areas had to rely on more informal arrangements. In 1737, an Act of Parliament was passed "for better regulating the Night Watch" of the City of London which specified the number of paid constables that should be on duty each night. 

Henry Fielding established the Bow Street Runners in 1749; between 1754 and 1780, Sir John Fielding reorganised Bow Street like a police station, with a team of efficient, paid constables.

In 1800, some town authorities became more involved in improving local policing. An Act of Parliament in 1800 enabled Glasgow to establish the City of Glasgow Police. As the population in industrial towns grew, more local Acts were passed to improve policing arrangements in those towns, such as Rochdale in Lancashire in 1825, and Oldham in 1827. In Ireland, the Belfast Borough Police (1800), Dublin Metropolitan Police (1836) and Londonderry Borough Police (1848) were founded. (At this time, all of Ireland was part of the UK.)

Sir Robert Peel, appointed Chief Secretary for Ireland in 1812, found local magistrates and the Baronial Police unable to maintain law and order. He set up a Peace Preservation Force in 1814 and a system of county constabularies under the Irish Constabulary Act 1822. 

Robert Peel (as Home Secretary) introduced the Metropolitan Police Act 1829, based on the findings of a committee originally set up in 1812, and the Metropolitan Police was founded on 29 September 1829. The new constables were nicknamed 'peelers' or 'bobbies' after Peel. 'Bobbies' continues to be commonly used.

In November 1830, the Liverpool and Manchester Railway set up their own police establishment under legislation going back to 1673. They were to preserve law and order on the construction site and to control movement of railway traffic by hand signals. Signalmen are known as 'bobbies'. This practice spread with the development of railways, and small shelters were erected at these stations, becoming known as police stations. Where there was no police control, they were just known as stations.

London

London in the early 1800s had a population of nearly a million and a half people but was policed by only 450 constables and 4,500 night watchmen. The idea of professional policing was taken up by Sir Robert Peel when he became Home Secretary in 1822. 

Peel's Metropolitan Police Act 1829 established a full-time, professional and centrally-organised police force for the greater London area known as the Metropolitan Police. The new Metropolitan Police were responsible for an area of 7 miles in radius from the centre of the city (excluding the City of London), which was later extended to 15 miles. 

The government intentionally tried to avoid creating any likeness between the police and a military force; in particular the officers of the new police force were not armed, and a blue uniform was chosen that was dissimilar to those used by the army. During this period, the Metropolitan Police was accountable directly to the Home Secretary (whereas today it is accountable to the Mayor of London and the Metropolitan Police Authority).

The City of London was not included within the remit of the Metropolitan Police. The Mayor and Corporation of the City of London refused to be part of a London-wide force because the City of London had certain liberties dating back to Magna Carta. The London City Police was formed in 1832, later renamed in 1839 to the City of London Police.

Boroughs and counties
In the early 1800s, Newcastle had a police force that was accountable to the mayor and council. Liverpool, at the time a city of around 250,000 people, had only watchmen and parish constables for policing; with a small police force for the dock area. 

The establishment of more formal policing in cities started to gain more support among the public as cities grew and society became more prosperous and better organised; through better understanding of legal rights, higher standards of education, and better informed through the press. 

In 1835 the Municipal Corporations Act was passed by Parliament which required 178 Royal Boroughs to set up paid police forces. In 1839 the Rural Constabulary Act allowed county areas to establish police forces if they chose to at a local level: Wiltshire was the first county to do this. A further eight county police forces were formed in 1839, twelve in 1840, four in 1841 and another four by 1851.

By 1851 there were around 13,000 policemen in England and Wales, although existing law still did not require local authorities to establish local police forces.

In England the Retford Borough Police are possibly the shortest existing police force, having been formed on 1 January 1836 and then amalgamating with the Nottinghamshire Police on the first day it was allowed to under the County Police Act 1839 only its 5th anniversary - 1 January 1841.

National policing 

The UK's first national police force was the Irish Constabulary, established in 1837. It received the appellation Royal Irish Constabulary in 1867 after its success in suppressing the Fenian Rising.

In 1847 two pieces of national legislation were enacted - the Town Police Clauses Act 1847 and the Harbours, Docks, and Piers Clauses Act 1847. Parliament continued to discuss the idea of national policing and, by the early 1850s, the Government was thinking about implementing policing across the nation.

After the County and Borough Police Act in 1856, policing became a requirement throughout England and Wales paid for by central government Treasury department funds distributed to local government. In addition, the Act formed a "central inspectorate of constabulary" that would assess the effectiveness of each constabulary and report regularly to the Home Secretary. Parliament passed a similar Act for Scotland in 1857.

By 1900, England, Wales and Scotland had 46,800 policemen and 243 constabularies.

The Police Act 1946 led to the merger of a number of smaller town forces and surrounding county forces, leaving 117 constabularies. Further mergers took place following the Police Act 1964 which cut the number of police forces in England and Wales to 47, and Scotland to 20.

Modern policing
Chief Constable Captain Athelstan Popkess is credited with being largely responsible for transforming the British Police Service from its Victorian era 'beat policing' model to the modern reactive response model, through his development of the 'Mechanized Division'. Under his stewardship from 1930 to 1959, Nottingham City Police were the first force in the UK to develop the use of two-way radio communication. As early as 1931 they used radios to deploy mobile police patrol cars remotely, and receive updates from them in return.  

Popkess and the Nottingham City Police would expand this pioneering method and develop tactics to use it to its full potential, including: overlaying mobile patrol areas on top of several existing foot beats, allowing responding Mechanized Division officers to collect colleagues on foot and take them to incidents; 'snatch plans' to pot up police cars at key road junctions in the event of serious crimes; and 'Q Cars' or 'Q Cruisers', unmarked vehicles disguised as civilian cars or delivery vans for covert patrol. 

In 1947 he further linked this to an automated burglar alarm system which reported potential break-ins directly to a police control room where police cars could be deployed instantly to attend.

Since the 1960s, police forces in the United Kingdom have been merged and modernised by several Acts of Parliament.

Height of officers
In the 19th and early 20th centuries most forces required that recruits be at least  in height. Nottingham City Police had a minimum height requirement of 6 feet. Many senior officers argued that height was a vital requirement for a uniformed constable. In May 1990, the minimum height requirement was dropped by the Metropolitan Police, and other police forces had followed suit by September 1990. No British force now requires its recruits to be of any minimum height.

The MacPherson report of 1999 recommended against height restrictions, arguing that they may discriminate against those of ethnic backgrounds who are genetically predisposed to be shorter than average. Both officers had to have their uniforms specially made for them due to their size.

Timeline of Selected Events

Study of Police History 
Police History has become an area of study in itself with organisations such as the Police History Society existing since 1985 to further develop this field of knowledge. It is recognised as specialist area of academia; with notable experts including Clive Emsley, Dr Chris Williams, Martin Stallion, and Richard Cowley.

Sub-fields of police history include Ripperologists, a group devoted to looking into cases linked to Jack the Ripper and the state of policing of the time. 

An imprint from the publisher Mango Books called 'Blue Lamp Books' specialises in policing history works.

See also
 History of criminal justice § Modern police
 Law enforcement

References

Further reading
 Churchill, David. Crime control and everyday life in the Victorian city: the police and the public (2017).
 Churchill, David C. "Rethinking the state monopolisation thesis: the historiography of policing and criminal justice in nineteenth-century England." Crime, Histoire & Sociétés/Crime, History & Societies 18.1 (2014): 131-152.  online
 Emsley,  Clive. "Police" in James Eli Adams, ed., Encyclopedia of the Victorian Era (2004) 3:221-24.
 Emsley,  Clive.Crime and Society in England, 1750–1900 (5th ed. 2018)
 Emsley, Clive. The English police: A political and social history (2014).
 Lyman, J.L. "The Metropolitan Police Act of 1829: An Analysis of Certain Events Influencing the Passage and Character of the Metropolitan Police Act in England," Journal of Criminal Law, Criminology, and Police Science (1964) 55#1 pp. 141–154 online 
 Taylor, James. "White-collar crime and the law in nineteenth-century Britain." Business History 60.3 (2018): 343-360.
 Wilson, David. Pain and Retribution: a short history of British Prisons 1066 to the present (Reaktion Books, 2014).

 
Legal history of the United Kingdom
History of the United Kingdom by topic